Alex Sutherland is a former football (soccer) player who represented New Zealand at international level.

Sutherland made a single appearance in an official international for the All Whites in a 1–10 loss to Australia on 11 July 1936. Although New Zealand have been beaten by more in unofficial matches, notably England Amateurs in 1937 and Manchester United in 1967, it remains New Zealand's heaviest defeat in official internationals.

References 

Year of birth missing
Possibly living people
New Zealand association footballers
New Zealand international footballers
Association footballers not categorized by position